Poovizhi Vasalile is a 1987 Indian Tamil-language thriller film directed by Fazil. The film stars Sathyaraj, Sujitha and Karthika, with Raghuvaran, Babu Antony, Nizhalgal Ravi, T. S. Raghavendra and Rajyalakshmi playing supporting roles. It is a remake of the Malayalam film Poovinu Puthiya Poonthennal. The film was released on 14 January 1987. The film has a certain cult following and has been noted for the villainous performance of Antony and Raghuvaran.

Plot 

A deaf-mute boy Benny and his mother witness a man getting killed by Anand and Ranjith. So the killers also killed the mother, but Benny manages to escape from them.

Jeevan is an alcoholic who is not able to recover from the tragic death of his family. Jeevan finds Benny when he is sleeping in the trash and adopts him as Raja, naming him after his son. Soon, he meets Yamuna and becomes close friends without knowing that she is Raja's aunt. Raja recognises his mother's murderer in a bar along with their boss.

First, the police arrest Jeevan for kidnapping Raja and for hiding his mother Stella, but the police discover Stella's body with Raja's help and Yamuna understands the boy is none other than her sister's son Benny. Thereafter, Anand and Ranjith kidnap Raja from Yamuna, so Jeevan kills the murderers and goes to jail.

Cast 

Sathyaraj as Jeevan
Sujitha as Benny/Raja
Karthika as Yamuna
Raghuvaran as Anand
Babu Antony as Ranjith
Nizhalgal Ravi as Ravi, a police inspector
T. S. Raghavendra as Viswanathan
Rajyalakshmi as Ganga/Stella, Benny's mother
Adoor Bhasi as Father Joseph Stephen
Sreenath as Micheal, Benny's father (guest appearance)
Charle in a guest appearance
Delhi Ganesh as Doctor (guest appearance)
Raju
Madhoo
Chittan as Sakkarakatti
Sivagami

Soundtrack 
The soundtrack was composed by Ilaiyaraaja, with lyrics written by him, Gangai Amaran, Muthulingam and Kamakodiyan.

Reception 
Jayamanmadhan of Kalki appreciated Fazil for being able to visually convey what he wanted, but said Ilaiyaraaja's music, Raghuvaran's acting and the cinematography were "okay. okay".

References

External links 

1980s crime thriller films
1980s Tamil-language films
1987 films
Films directed by Fazil
Films scored by Ilaiyaraaja
Indian crime thriller films
Tamil remakes of Malayalam films